Khosrekh is a rural locality (a selo) in Kulinsky District, Republic of Dagestan, Russia. The population was 1,630 as of 2010. There are 5 streets.

Geography 
Khosrekh is located 12 km southeast of Vachi (the district's administrative centre) by road. Kuli and Sumbatl are the nearest rural localities.

Nationalities 
Laks live there.

Famous residents 
 Shirvani Chalaev (composer)
 Magomed-Zagid Aminov (poet, translator)

References 

Rural localities in Kulinsky District